Durolevum was a Roman settlement in Britain. The only surviving mention of it from antiquity appears in the Antonine Itinerary, where it forms part of the Roman equivalent of Watling Street, connecting Rutupiae (Richborough) to Londinium (London). It is now thought to have been located at Ospringe in Kent, after the discovery of Roman ruins between Judd's Hill and Beacon Hill in 1931, but this remains uncertain.

See also
 Faversham Stone Chapel
 Newington, another possibility for the site of Durolevum

References

Roman towns and cities in England
Populated places established in the 1st century
1st-century establishments in Roman Britain
Faversham